Cilia Adela Flores de Maduro (born 15 October 1956) is a Venezuelan lawyer and politician. She is married to the President of Venezuela Nicolás Maduro, making her the First Lady. Since 2015, she has also been a deputy in the National Assembly of Venezuela, of which she was president from 2006 to 2011, for her home state of Cojedes. In 2017, the Constituent National Assembly was founded, in which she is a member of the Presidential Commission.

Political career
As the lead attorney for Hugo Chávez's defense team, she was instrumental in securing Chávez's release from prison in 1994 after his unsuccessful coup in 1992.

Tactical Command for the Revolution
While serving as chair of the Political Command of the Bolivarian Revolution, Flores was part of the Tactical Command for the Revolution, an organization that ran the majority of Hugo Chávez's political machine. On 7 April, days before the 2002 Venezuelan coup d'état attempt, Flores along with Guillermo García Ponce and Freddy Bernal shared plans of using the Bolivarian Circles as a paramilitary force to end opposition marches and defend Chávez in Miraflores Palace by organizing them into brigades.

On 11 April while opposition marchers headed towards Miraflores Palace in protest, Bolivarian Circles gathered around the palace armed with rocks, clubs and molotov cocktails all within view of the National Guard that was stationed nearby. The Bolivarian Circles then participated in demonstrations that became violent.

National Assembly

In 2000, Flores was elected as a deputy in the National Assembly. A member of the United Socialist Party of Venezuela (PSUV), Flores replaced her future husband Maduro as Speaker of the Assembly in August 2006, when he was appointed Minister of Foreign Affairs; she was the first woman to serve as president of the National Assembly (2006–2011). On 10 January 2007, Flores swore Chávez into office following the 2006 presidential election.

From 2012 until the election of Maduro, she served as the Attorney General of Venezuela.

First Lady
Upon Maduro's tight victory in the 2013 presidential election over Henrique Capriles, Cilia Flores became Venezuela's First Lady, a position that had been vacant since 2003.

As First Lady, Flores ran for a seat in the National Assembly in Venezuela's 2015 parliamentary elections as a candidate for the Great Patriotic Pole. She said she would use her seat to defend the social rights of citizens and the achievements of the Bolivarian Revolution.

In 2017, Flores was elected into the Constituent Assembly of Venezuela.

Controversy

Nepotism

Flores was accused of nepotism with individuals claiming that several of her close relatives became employees of the National Assembly while she was a deputy.<ref name="ETcolombia">{{cite news|last1=Lares Martiz|first1=Valentina|title=Denuncian por nepotismo a la presidenta del Congreso venezolano, Cilia Flores|url=http://www.eltiempo.com/archivo/documento/CMS-4378170|access-date=12 August 2015|agency=El Tiempo (Colombia)|date=15 July 2008}}</ref>"Es falso que tenga muchos familiares en la Asamblea"  30 May 2008. According to Tal Cual'', 16 relatives of Flores were in an office while she was in the National Assembly. Flores responded to the reporters who shared the nepotism allegations stating it was part of a smear campaign, calling them "mercenaries of the pen". Both opposition and members of the government denounced the alleged nepotism calling it an injustice, with one PSUV member taking the allegations to Venezuela's Ministry of Labour. In 2012, relatives of Flores were removed from office though some received other occupations in the government a year later.

Flores' son,  Walter Jacob Gavidia Flores, whose last salary through 2015 was less than $1,000, made multiple international trips in 2015 and 2016 on private flights costing approximately $20,000 per trip. Gavidia Flores spent most of his time in the United States, though he also took chartered flights to France, Germany, Malta and Spain.

Narcosobrinos incident

On 10 November 2015, two nephews of Cilia Flores, Efraín Antonio Campos Flores and Francisco Flores de Freitas, were arrested in Port-au-Prince, Haiti by local police while attempting to make a deal to transport 800 kilograms of cocaine destined for New York City and were turned over to the US Drug Enforcement Administration (DEA) where they were flown directly to the United States. Campos stated on the DEA plane that he was the step son of President Maduro and that he grew up in the Maduro household while being raised by Flores. The men traveled to Haiti with Venezuelan diplomatic passports but did not have diplomatic immunity according to former head of DEA international operations Michael Vigil. The two were previously monitored and filmed by the DEA between October and November 2015 after they contacted a DEA informant for advice on trafficking cocaine and brought a kilogram of cocaine to the informant to show its quality. The incident happened at a time when multiple high-ranking members of the Venezuelan government were being investigated for their involvement of drug trafficking.

On 18 November 2016, Flores' two nephews were found guilty of trying to ship drugs into the United States so they could  "obtain a large amount of cash to help their family stay in power".

Sanctions 
Flores has been sanctioned by several countries and is banned from entering neighboring Colombia. The Colombian government maintains a list of people banned from entering Colombia or subject to expulsion; as of January 2019, the list had 200 people with a "close relationship and support for the Nicolás Maduro regime".

Responding to the May 2018 Venezuelan presidential election, Canada sanctioned 14 Venezuelans, including Flores, stating that the "economic, political and humanitarian crisis in Venezuela has continued to worsen as it moves ever closer to full dictatorship". The government said the 2018 presidential election was "illegitimate and anti-democratic", and sanctioned Flores, along with 13 other members of the ANC and TSJ.

On 27 March 2018, Panama sanctioned 55 public officials and 16 businesses that operate in Panama, related to the family of Flores. The sanctioned businesses have members of the Malpica-Flores family on their boards of directors. The companies, headed by various members of Flores' family and recently created, were sanctioned for allegedly laundering money.

The US Treasury Department seized a private jet and imposed sanctions on Maduro's inner circle in September 2018; Flores and top Maduro administration officials were sanctioned.  Maduro responded to his wife's sanctions, saying "You don't mess with Cilia. You don’t mess with family. Don’t be cowards! Her only crime [is] being my wife."
The United States said the sanctions were a response to the "plundering" of Venezuela's resources.

Personal life
Flores had her first marriage with Walter Ramón Gavidia. She is now married to President Nicolás Maduro, whom she replaced as President of the National Assembly in August 2006 when he resigned to become Minister of Foreign Affairs. The two had been in a romantic relationship since the 1990s when Flores was Hugo Chávez's lawyer following the 1992 Venezuelan coup d'état attempts and were married in July 2013 months after Maduro became president.

Her husband Maduro has one son, Nicolás Maduro Guerra, whom he appointed to senior government posts: Chief of the presidency's Special Inspectors Body, head of the National Film School, and a seat in the 2017 Constituent National Assembly, while Flores has an adopted son, Efraín Antonio Campos Flores, who is her nephew (her deceased sister's son).

See also

List of first ladies of Venezuela

References

External links

 
 

|-

|-

1956 births
Living people
Speakers of the National Assembly (Venezuela)
Venezuelan women lawyers
Politicians from Caracas
United Socialist Party of Venezuela politicians
First Ladies of Venezuela
Members of the National Assembly (Venezuela)
21st-century Venezuelan women politicians
21st-century Venezuelan politicians
People from Cojedes (state)
People of the Crisis in Venezuela
Attorneys general of Venezuela
Members of the Venezuelan Constituent Assembly of 2017